Jadera hinnulea is a species of soapberry bug in the family Rhopalidae. It is found in Central America and North America.

References

Articles created by Qbugbot
Insects described in 1979
Serinethinae